"Next to Me" is a song by Scottish recording artist Emeli Sandé. The single was first released in Ireland on 10 February 2012 as the third single from her debut studio album, Our Version of Events (2012). "Next to Me" was written by Sandé and co-written by Hugo Chegwin, Harry Craze and A. K. Paul. The recording was also produced by Craze and Chegwin.

On the week ending 23 February 2012, the track debuted at number one on the Irish Singles Chart, also topping the Scottish Singles Chart and peaking at number two on the UK Singles Chart. "Next to Me" was also the first single from the album in the US, released on 17 April 2012, and it became her first to reach the top 40 in the US Billboard Hot 100, charting at number 25. It was the 14th best-selling single of 2012 in the UK.

Reception
Lewis Corner of Digital Spy gave the song a positive review stating: "Sandé insists of her morally righteous right-hand man over head-nodding beats and gospel-choir harmonies. Whether this mysterious entity is a lover, her faith or the music itself is never clarified, but one thing is for certain; if it inspires Sandé to write music of this standard, then her claims of perfection are rightly justified."

Music video
A music video to accompany the release of "Next to Me" was first released onto YouTube on 18 January 2012 at a total length of 3:31.

In popular culture

Media
"Next to Me" was used the Chilean commercial Top+Shoes in Almacenes Paris, and was featured in the soundtrack of Chilean soap opera Soltera otra vez (2nd season). The song was performed by Rachel Berry (Lea Michele) and her mother, Shelby Corcoran (Idina Menzel), in the 2013 Glee episode "Sweet Dreams". It was also used in video games Zumba Fitness: World Party and Dance Central Spotlight.

Track listing

Digital download
 "Next to Me" – 3:16

Digital download – Sadek remix
 "Next to Me"  – 2:54

Digital remixes – European EP
 "Next to Me" (Nu:Tone Remix) – 6:06
 "Next to Me" (Mojam Remix) – 3:51
 "Next to Me" (Dorian Remix) – 6:30
 "Next to Me" (Next to Me in Bed Remix) – 3:59

Digital download – Kendrick Lamar Remix
 "Next to Me"  – 3:55

Digital remixes – American EP
 "Next to Me"  – 5:48
 "Next to Me"  – 4:07
 "Next to Me"  – 4:26
 "Next to Me"  – 4:06

Digital download – Spanglish Remix
 "Next to Me"  – 3:17

2013 Brit Awards
 "Clown" / "Next to Me" (Live from the BRITs) – 4:53

Personnel
Emeli Sande - lead vocals
Craze & Hoax, James Murray, Mustafa Omer: Production, all instruments and programming (except piano and bass)
Abeeku "Beyku" Ribeiro -  backing vocals
Anup Paul - bass guitar
Neil Cowley - piano
Patsy McKay, Jenny La Touche, Awsa Bergstrom, Rebecca Jones, Charlene Jones, Crystal Jones, Lorraine Barnes, John Gibbons, Jack Vasiliou, Roxy Harris - choir backing vocals

Production
Produced by Craze & Hoax for Method Music Mgmt. and Delirious Blacksmith Music Mgmt. Ltd., with additional production by Mojam Music (for Delirious Blacksmith Music Mgmt.)
Recorded by Craze & Hoax
Mixed by Tom Elmhirst, with assistance by Ben Baptie
Mastered by Simon Davey
Published by Stellar Songs Ltd./EMI Music Publishing Ltd./Naughty Words/Sony-ATV Music Publishing Ltd.

Charts and certifications

Weekly charts

Year-end charts

Certifications

Release history

See also
 List of number-one dance singles of 2013 (U.S.)

References

2012 singles
2012 songs
Emeli Sandé songs
Songs written by Emeli Sandé
Song recordings produced by Craze & Hoax
Irish Singles Chart number-one singles
Number-one singles in Scotland
Contemporary R&B ballads
Soul ballads
Virgin Records singles